London Buses route 10 was a Transport for London contracted bus route in London, England. It ran between Hammersmith bus station and King's Cross station, and was operated by London United.

History

Route 10 commenced on 13 August 1988 to replace route 73 between Hammersmith and Hyde Park Corner following the latter being diverted to Victoria. The initial route was between Hammersmith and King's Cross, and was run by the London United division. In April 1989, an allocation was introduced from the London Northern garage at Holloway. Route 10 was extended to the back of Holloway garage via York Way and Brecknock Road. Initially this section did not run during early mornings, late evenings or Sundays, but a Sunday service was later added. Some journeys were then extended to Archway rather than terminating in Tufnell Park. These were then withdrawn, but were reinstated following the withdrawal of local route C12 in 1998.

As part of a restructuring of services in the lead-up to the introduction of the London congestion charge, on 1 February 2003, route 10 was split in two: the route between Archway and Kings Cross, and as far as Marble Arch, was taken over by new route 390, and route 10 was shortened to serve only its original route between Hammersmith and King's Cross. Route 390 continued to be operated by Metroline with the AEC Routemasters which had operated route 10, while the new route 10 was operated by First London with Alexander ALX400 bodied Volvo B7TLs.

When next tendered, the route was awarded to Transdev London from 30 January 2010. It was operated out of Stamford Brook garage.

New Routemasters were introduced on 26 April 2014. The rear platform remained open from Monday to Friday between 06:00 and 19:30 when it was staffed by a conductor. This was ceased in September 2016 when conductors were withdrawn.

In 2015, Transport for London consulted on rerouting route 10 to serve Russell Square station. The route was modified on 25 June 2016. London United successfully tendered to retain the route from 28 January 2017 with a peak vehicle requirement of 23.

As part of a programme to reduce the number of bus routes traversing Oxford Street, route 10 ceased running on 23 November 2018. The Marble Arch to Hammersmith section has been replaced by a redirected route 23.

Route
Route 10 operated via these primary locations:
Hammersmith bus station  for Hammersmith tube stations 
Hammersmith Broadway
Brook Green
Kensington Olympia station   
High Street Kensington station 
Kensington Palace
Royal Albert Hall
Knightsbridge station 
Hyde Park Corner station 
Marble Arch station 
Selfridges
Oxford Circus station 
Tottenham Court Road station 
British Museum
Russell Square station 
Euston bus station  for Euston station   
British Library
St Pancras station  
King's Cross station

References

External links

Bus routes in London
Transport in the London Borough of Camden
Transport in the London Borough of Hammersmith and Fulham
Transport in the Royal Borough of Kensington and Chelsea
Transport in the City of Westminster